Metrolink  is a commuter rail system in Southern California, serving Los Angeles, Orange, Riverside, San Bernardino, and Ventura counties, as well as to Oceanside in San Diego County. Arrow is operated under a contract with the San Bernardino County Transportation Authority.

Metrolink connects with Los Angeles County's Metro Rail and Metro Busway systems, San Diego County's Coaster commuter rail and Sprinter hybrid rail services, and with Amtrak's Pacific Surfliner, Coast Starlight, Southwest Chief, Sunset Limited, and Texas Eagle intercity rail services. Metrolink owns several hundred miles of track; however, it also shares track with freight railroads.

The system, founded in 1991 as the Southern California Regional Rail Authority (SCRRA) and adopting "Metrolink" as its moniker, started operation in 1992. Average weekday ridership was 42,928 as of 2017. It is operated by Amtrak under contract with the SCRRA.

Routes 
In addition to suburban communities and cities, Metrolink also serves several points of interest such as Downtown Los Angeles, Downtown San Bernardino, Burbank, Hollywood Burbank Airport, California State University, Los Angeles, Angel Stadium of Anaheim, and the San Clemente Pier. Special service has also been extended to the Pomona Fairplex, the Ventura County Fairgrounds, and the Auto Club Speedway for certain events.

The system currently consists of eight lines:

Fares 

Metrolink's fare structure is based on a flat fee for boarding the train and an additional cost for distance with fares being calculated in 25-cent increments between stations.

Metrolink tickets are valid fare for most connecting buses and trains; certain Metrolink tickets are valid on certain Amtrak routes.

Fare increases normally occur annually in July, to coincide with increased fuel and labor expenses, and have generally averaged between 3.5% and 5% per year (although restructuring caused a larger jump in rates). The oil price increases since 2003 are partly to blame for consistently increasing fares, as Metrolink trains are powered by diesel fuel.

In late 2018, Metrolink announced that San Bernardino Line ticket prices would be reduced by 25% at least through 2019 in an attempt to increase ridership. Similar discounts have been introduced to other lines since 2016.

History

Early history

Inter-city rail service around Los Angeles persisted through the formation of Amtrak in 1971. However, rail operations suitable for commuters remained elusive throughout the 1980s. On October 18, 1982, CalTrain, LA's first commuter rail service, began on the existing Ventura County Line, but only lasted a few months before termination, on March 1, 1983.

The Orange County Transportation Commission initiated the Amtrak-operated Orange County Commuter in early 1990, running between Los Angeles and San Juan Capistrano, but a more comprehensive approach was deemed necessary. Senate Bill 1402 was signed into law on May 25, 1990, which directed local transportation authorities to establish a regional plan for commuter rail by the year's end.

The rights to use Los Angeles Union Station were purchased from Union Pacific, the station's owner at the time, for $17 million in the same year ($ adjusted for inflation) (Union Station has since been purchased by the Los Angeles County Metropolitan Transportation Authority). Freight operations would continue on some corridors under coordination with passenger services. The joint powers authority was formally founded in 1991.

Contemporary history
Services commenced on October 26, 1992, under contracted operation by Amtrak with the Ventura, Santa Clarita (now the Antelope Valley), and San Bernardino Lines. In 1993, service was expanded to include the Riverside Line and the following year the Orange County Line was conveyed from Amtrak branding to Metrolink. The Inland Empire-Orange County Line opened in 1995, and more trains on the Orange County service were funded. The 91 Line opened in 2002.

From July 2004, Metrolink fares were changed from zone based to one based on distance. In 2005, a five-year operational contract was awarded to Connex Railroad/Veolia Transport. That same year, the Orange County Transportation Authority approved a plan to increase frequencies to 76 trains daily on the Orange County and Inland Empire-Orange County Lines by 2009, and funding for increased Metrolink service was included in the renewal of the Measure M sales tax for transportation approved by voters in November 2006. A proposed station in Yorba Linda was canceled after the city rejected it due to local opposition on March 16, 2004.

In July 2008, it was announced that ridership had risen 16% over the previous year. Following the 2008 Chatsworth train collision in which 25 people died and 135 were injured a number of safety measures were taken; in the fall of 2009, inward-facing video cameras were installed in locomotives in order to ensure that staff were complying with regulations, in particular a ban on use of mobile phones.  In 2010, the first of 117 energy absorbing passenger carriages (which lessen the toll on passengers in the case of an accident) were received by the operator.  Amtrak regained the contract to operate Metrolink beginning in July 2010. Average weekday ridership for the fourth quarter of 2009 was 38,400.

In 2010, to save money in the face of funding cuts, the Metrolink board voted to reduce mid-day service on the Inland Empire–Orange County Line, as well as weekend service on both the Orange County and Inland Empire–Orange County lines.

Average weekday ridership was 41,000 during May 2011. A survey found that 90% of users during a typical weekday in 2009 would have previously driven alone or carpooled and that the system replaced an estimated 25,000 vehicle trips. During a weekend closure of Interstate 405 in July 2011, the system recorded its highest-ever weekend ridership of 20,000 boardings which was 50% higher than the same weekend in 2010 and 10% higher than the previous weekend ridership record which occurred during U2 360° Tour in June 2011. Ridership continued to rise in 2012 (up 2%), when average weekday ridership reached 42,265. Although 2013 annual boardings were almost 12.07 million, ridership dropped to 11.74 million by fall 2014 which was contrary to projections. Blaming the decrease on the worst recession since World War II, Metrolink said it found itself caught between cutting service and boosting fares, both of which would likely further decrease ridership.

Metrolink began offering mobile ticketing in early 2016.

The Riverside County Transportation Commission (RCTC) extended the 91 Line southeast  to Perris, using the existing San Jacinto Branch Line, which it purchased in 1993. Initial plans were for construction/renovation of the line to begin in 2012, but these were delayed by a lawsuit filed by homeowners in the affected area, who challenged the RCTC's environmental report. The lawsuit was settled in late July 2013. Construction on the $248.3 million extension began in October 2013; service was originally planned to begin in December 2015, and then in February 2016. In mid-February 2016, the extension's opening was planned in March of that year. The extension officially opened in June 2016.

COVID-19 and Arrow 
When COVID-19 impacted Los Angeles and its communities in March 2020, Metrolink ridership fell by 90%. Metrolink increased cleaning measures, added COVID safety protocols, and reduced service. On March 26, 2020, the agency ran on a temporarily reduced schedule, removing most trains. 

On April 4, 2022, Metrolink restored its 24 trains and added 2 new trains to the schedule. Metrolink and Amtrak also entered into a code-sharing agreement on the Ventura County Line, with Pacific Surfliner trains A761, A770, A777, and A784 accepting valid Metrolink tickets between stations served by the Ventura County Line and Ventura station. Metrolink also announced that Metrolink service to Ventura station on the Ventura County Line is planned.

Arrow, formerly the Redlands Passenger Rail Project, opened on October 24, 2022. The  eastward rail extension from San Bernardino to Redlands was planned by the San Bernardino Associated Governments (SANBAG). The association considered whether to extend commuter rail along the corridor or to install either bus rapid transit or light rail lines, but in December 2015, SANBAG officials said they planned to extend Metrolink service only to the San Bernardino Transit Center and use diesel multiple units operated by Omnitrans in lieu of Metrolink locomotive-hauled coaches on the rest of the route. In late 2019, Metrolink assumed the operating rights and carried out construction after Omnitrans was dismissed due to restructuring of that organization. Groundbreaking for Arrow's construction took place on July 19, 2019.

Notable incidents 

218 people were killed in Metrolink train incidents from 1993 to 2008, the majority of these being pedestrians killed on the tracks, whilst 39 were as a result of three train collisions. Since 2008, just one person onboard Metrolink trains has died, a locomotive engineer killed in Oxnard when a truck was left on a crossing.

Placentia, April 2002 

Two people died and 22 were seriously injured on April 23, 2002, when a BNSF freight train collided head-on with a Metrolink train in Placentia, near the Atwood Junction, at the intersection of Orangethorpe Avenue and Richfield Road. Both trains were on the same east–west track moving toward one another. The Metrolink had the right-of-way; it was supposed to switch to a southbound track. The BNSF train was supposed to slow and stop just before the switch while the Metrolink passed, but the crew missed a signal one and a half miles back warning them to slow down. By the time the crew saw the red "stop" signal at the switch and the Metrolink train, they were going too fast to avoid a collision. Although there was speculation that the signals alerting the BNSF to slow and stop had malfunctioned, an investigation later concluded that it was human error by the crew that caused the accident. Over 260 passengers were injured and 3 people including a BNSF employee were killed.

Glendale, January 2005 

Eleven people were killed (including an off-duty sheriff's deputy and a train conductor) and over 100 people were injured, about 40 seriously on January 26, 2005, when a Metrolink passenger train collided with a vehicle parked on the tracks, which then jackknifed and struck a stationary freight locomotive and a Metrolink train moving in the opposite direction. The man who parked the vehicle on the tracks, Juan Manuel Alvarez, was apprehended and charged with 11 counts of first-degree murder with special circumstances, including murder by train wrecking. On June 26, 2008, Alvarez was convicted on the 11 murder counts and sentenced to life imprisonment without the possibility of parole.

Chatsworth (Los Angeles), September 2008 

Twenty-five people were killed and 135 injured when a Metrolink commuter train carrying 222 persons collided head on with a Union Pacific freight train, toppling one of the passenger cars and the locomotive onto its side in the Chatsworth district of Los Angeles. Along with the 135 people who were injured, 81 were transported to local hospitals in serious or critical condition. The velocity of the trains caused the Metrolink locomotive to telescope into the first passenger car.

Oxnard, February 2015 

Thirty people were injured when southbound Metrolink Ventura County Line train 102 (East Ventura to LA Union Station) crashed into a truck that was stopped on the tracks at the Rice Avenue crossing near Oxnard at about 5:40 am on February 24, 2015. One person, the train's engineer, later died of his injuries. The driver, who had left the truck before the crash, was located by the police and taken into custody. The train consisted of a Hyundai-Rotem "guardian fleet" cab car in the lead, a Bombardier Bi-level "bike car" coach, two Hyundai-Rotem "guardian fleet" coach cars and an EMD F59PH locomotive. After this accident, Metrolink leased 40 diesel freight locomotives from BNSF, to be placed into service as temporary cab cars while they investigated problems with their Hyundai-Rotem cars. On July 8, 2016, the Metrolink board approved a $1.5 million plan to repair the plows on the Hyundai Rotem cab cars. Once the repairs were completed, the cars returned to service and the leased BNSF locomotives were returned.

Future 
Metrolink has grown in popularity, and there are a number of planned extensions of the system and new stations. Station parking capacity has also been strained.

Train frequency increases and SCORE
On April 26, 2018, Metrolink was awarded $1.175 billion from the California State Transportation Agency in order to dramatically increase train service along its existing lines and for the expansion of the Metrolink station in time for the 2028 Summer Olympics. These funds will be used to essentially convert most of Metrolink's lines into an inter-city rail instead of a commuter rail service.

High speed rail interface 
During the initial years of operation of the California High-Speed Rail between Merced and Burbank, projected to commence in 2022 (but since repeatedly delayed to 2033), passengers would use Metrolink for travel between Burbank and downtown Los Angeles. An alternative plan would have track-sharing to Union Station but this would require electrification for that portion of the line. This alternate plan would provide a "one-seat ride" at the start of service between the Central Valley and downtown, or even Orange County.

Placentia infill station
A new Metrolink station in Placentia, which will serve the 91/Perris Valley Line's north Orange County passengers, has completed its final design phase, save for issues related to the parking needed to accompany the station. Construction on the $24 million Placentia station began in 2018, and was scheduled to open in 2024, but now is on hold pending further negotiations with BNSF.

Burbank Junction speed improvement project
On November 9, 2022, Metrolink broke ground on the Burbank Junction speed improvement project. The project will realign and replace the mainline track and siding between Burbank Boulevard and Magnolia Boulevard. The project will shorten trip lengths on the Antelope Valley Line trains, Ventura County Line trains, Pacific Surfliner trains, and Coast Starlight trains by one and a half minutes and will permit trains to operate with 30-minute headways in both directions, massively improving service frequencies along the corridors. The location of the tracks will be slightly realigned in order to accommodate a new pedestrian overcrossing. The project was delayed by almost one year, with the project initially scheduled to break ground in the winter of 2021 and was expected to be completed in the winter of 2022. The current expected completion date is the Summer of 2023.

Expansion to Temecula and Hemet
In 2008, lobbyists pushed for a rail line to Temecula in southwestern Riverside County via the 91 Line's La Sierra station. While this proposed line could follow the route of an abandoned freight line, it would require significant funding, as freight service ceased almost 30 years ago. Despite this, the Riverside County Transportation Commission's 2008 Commuter Rail Feasibility Study still lists this route as one possibility being considered. Expansion to Hemet has also been discussed, with two stations planned.

Expansion to the Coachella Valley
The cities of the Coachella Valley (Palm Springs, Cathedral City, Palm Desert, Indio, and Coachella) have requested commuter rail service from Los Angeles and Orange County, but the Union Pacific Railroad opposes further passenger service on its tracks. Nonetheless, in 1999, the Coachella Valley Association of Governments was investigating the possibility of two daily round trips via the 91 Line from Los Angeles's Union Station through Fullerton and Riverside to stations in Palm Springs and Indio (with a possible stop near Palm Desert), possibly through a partnership with Amtrak. This extension would likewise require significant money for infrastructure improvements: at least $500 million, according to the California State Rail Plan of 2005. Nonetheless, in 2013 Caltrans conducted a feasibility study of a Coachella Valley service and RCTC has resolved to pursue establishing one. By 2020, plans for the Coachella Valley–San Gorgonio Pass Rail Corridor Service had evolved to an Amtrak-operated service.

Extension to Kern County
Expansion to Kern County has been discussed in a 2012 Kern County Council of Governments report. The expansion proposed is to extend the Antelope Valley line from Lancaster to Rosamond, along the Rosamond Corridor to service Edwards Air Force Base.

Expansion to Northern Ventura County
The Santa Paula Branch Line was acquired by the Ventura County Transportation Commission in 1995. The railway, a former portion of the Southern Pacific Coast Line, connects the city of Ventura to Santa Clarita paralleling California State Route 126. Fillmore and Western Railway operates excursion service over a section of the line, though plans exist to rehabilitate tracks for Metrolink service. A study from 1991 estimated a cost between $70 million to $90 million to rebuild the line.

Orange County maintenance facility
As of December 1, 2022 Orange County Transportation Authority has laid a third track south of the Interstate 5 overpass in Irvine leading into the future site of the Orange County maintenance facility. The facility will serve as an additional site to service Metrolink and Amtrak trains on a parcel of land owned by the Orange County Transportation Authority just north of Irvine Station. The project will receive funding from California's SCORE Transit Intercity Rail Capital Program. The project also includes an extension to Ridge Valley, a road north of the parcel where the project will occur.

Governance 
The SCRRA is a joint powers authority governed by five county-level agencies that fund the Metrolink service: the Los Angeles County Metropolitan Transportation Authority, the Orange County Transportation Authority, the Riverside County Transportation Commission, the San Bernardino County Transportation Authority, and the Ventura County Transportation Commission.

Each agency appoints members to the Metrolink board of directors. Los Angeles gets four seats on the board, Orange, Riverside and San Bernardino counties each get two seats, and Ventura County gets one seat. There are also three non-voting, ex-officio members from the Southern California Association of Governments, the San Diego Association of Governments, and the state of California.

Metrolink is headquartered at the Wilshire Grand Center alongside the Southern California Association of Governments. Metrolink had previously operated out of the Metro Headquarters Building from 2011 until 2018, when Metro needed more space in their building.

Law enforcement service systemwide is handled by the Los Angeles County Sheriff Department's Transit Services Bureau.

Facilities 
Metrolink operates several maintenance facilities across its service area. Its Keller Yard Central Maintenance Facility (CMF) is located on the east bank of the Los Angeles River near the intersection of the 5 and 110 Freeways, just south of the location of the former Southern Pacific Taylor Yard. The facility is operated by Metrolink's equipment maintenance contractor: Bombardier Transportation. The Eastern Maintenance Facility is located in San Bernardino. Metrolink trains are also serviced at Coaster's Stuart Mesa Facility, which is located between San Clemente Pier and Oceanside at the southwest end of Camp Pendleton. This yard is owned by the North County Transit District.

Metrolink's operations center is located in Pomona, near the Pomona (North) station.

Rolling stock 

The core Metrolink fleet consists of 52 locomotives (EMD F125, EMD F59PH, and MPI MP36PH-3C), 137 active Bombardier Bi-level Coaches (Sentinel Fleet), and 137 Hyundai Rotem Bi-level cars (Guardian Fleet).

Since Arrow’s opening in October 2022, its fleet consists of 3 Stadler FLIRT trains.

Livery 
Until recently, most Metrolink-owned units were painted in a white livery with blue stripes that was introduced in the late 1990s as a replacement for a similar scheme that had been in use since the agency's launch. Beginning in 2007, the agency began the process of switching to a new blue and green "ribbons" design; the Guardian Fleet and EMD F125 locomotives already arrive from the factory in the new colors.

See also 

 Transportation in the Inland Empire
 Transportation in San Diego County
 Transportation in Los Angeles
 Hal Bernson, former Metrolink chairman

References

External links 

 
 
 Metrolink at the Los Angeles County Metropolitan Transportation Authority website
 Metrolink at the Orange County Transportation Authority website
 Metrolink at the Riverside County Transportation Commission website
 Metrolink at the San Bernardino Associated Governments website
 Metrolink at the Ventura County Transportation Commission website

 
Railway services introduced in 1992
1992 establishments in California
California railroads
Commuter rail in the United States
Passenger rail transportation in California
Public transportation in Los Angeles County, California
Public transportation in Orange County, California
Public transportation in Riverside County, California
Public transportation in San Bernardino County, California
Public transportation in San Diego County, California
Public transportation in Southern California
Public transportation in Ventura County, California
Standard gauge railways in the United States
Transit agencies in California